Jack Golson  (born 1926) is a British-born Australian archaeologist who has done extensive field work in Melanesia, Polynesia and Micronesia. He was born in Rochdale, England.

Golson studied history and archaeology at Cambridge University. In 1954, he lectured at the archaeology department of Auckland University in New Zealand where he began studies on pre-history in the Pacific Islands. Golson also worked towards improving standards and methods of archaeology in New Zealand and organised the New Zealand Archaeological Association.

In 1957, he carried out the first systematic survey of archaeological remains on Savai'i island in Samoa. In 1961, he was appointed Fellow in Prehistory at the Australian National University and carried out research in Australia and Papua New Guinea. He was the president of the World Archaeological Congress (1990–1994).

In 1991, Golson retired after 30 years at the Australian National University. He became a visiting Fellow there while focusing his work on Papua New Guinea. In the 1997 Queen's Birthday Honours Golson was appointed Officer of the Order of Australia (AO) for "service to education, particularly in the fields of pre-history and archaeology research in Asia and the Pacific Region". In 2001 he was awarded the Centenary Medal.

In 2002, he became a Life Member of the Australian Archaeological Association. In 2009 he, along with Clare Golson, was awarded the World Archaeological Congress Inaugural Lifetime Achievement Award.

See also
Archaeology in Samoa

References

1926 births
Living people
English archaeologists
Historians of the Pacific
Academic staff of the University of Auckland
Australian archaeologists
New Zealand archaeologists
Officers of the Order of Australia